This is list of reeves and mayors of Kitchener, Ontario, Canada. The village, town and later city were known as Berlin until 1916, when the city's name was changed to Kitchener. Berlin was incorporated as a village in 1854, became a town in 1870, and a city in 1912.

Village of Berlin (1854–1870)

Town of Berlin (1870–1912)

City of Berlin (1912–1916)

City of Kitchener (1916-present)

References 
 
 
 

Kitchenr, Ontario